Mentmore is a coastal locality in the Mackay Region, Queensland, Australia.

Geography 
Mentmore is undeveloped land. The Tonga Range runs through the centre of the locality with Tonga Mountain, the highest peak at 233 metres.

History 
Menmore was named and bounded by the Minister for Natural Resources 3 September 1999.

References 

Mackay Region
Coastline of Queensland
Localities in Queensland